Bhagavan Kovil is a Vishnu temple located near Dharapuram of Tirupur district in the Indian state of Tamil Nadu. It is a Vaishnavite temple dedicated to Lord ThirumalaiSamy. This temple is best known for the Ugadi festival which falls on Indian summer months of March or April and precisely on the Telugu new year day called Ugadi. This temple gets visitors in lakhs during the world-famous festival. There is tourist attraction near this place, Nallathangal Dam is located 4 km from Bhagavan kovil.

Geography 
The temple is located at 10°42′58″N 77°39′1″E

Transport 
The temple is less than 14 km from Dharapuram. The nearest railway station is Tiruppur Railway Station located 64 km. The nearest airport is Coimbatore International Airport located 92 km from this place. The closest hill station is Kodaikanal located 55 km.

Gallery

Hindu temples in Tiruppur district